Patharghata is an Upazila of Barguna District in the Division of Barisal, Bangladesh.

Geography 
It has 25,610 households and a total area of 387.36 km2.

Demographics 
As of the 1991 Bangladesh census, Patharghata has a population of 134635. Males constitute 50.56% of the population, and females 49.44%.  This Upazila's eighteen up population is 68751.  Patharghata has an average literacy rate of 66.4% (7+ years), and the national average of 32.4% literate.

Administration
Patharghata Upazila is divided into Patharghata Municipality and seven union parishads: Char Duani, Kakchira, Kalmegha, Kathaltali, Nachnapara, Patharghata, and Raihanpur. The union parishads are subdivided into 42 mauzas and 66 villages.

Patharghata Municipality is subdivided into 9 wards and 9 mahallas.

See also 
 Upazilas of Bangladesh
 Districts of Bangladesh
 Divisions of Bangladesh

References 

Upazilas of Barguna District